The Kettle Moraine Scenic Railway  was a heritage railway once located in North Lake, Wisconsin. It was founded in 1971 by Richard Hinebaugh, who bought a branch line from the Chicago, Milwaukee, St. Paul and Pacific Railroad (Milwaukee Road) to create a small museum. It ceased operations on October 21, 2001, because the town wanted to shut it down to make way for urban development in the late 1990s and early 2000s. Nothing remains at the former site, and the right-of-way has since been paved over and is now the Bugline Trail.

In July 2015, former McCloud No. 9 was sold to the Age of Steam Roundhouse in Sugarcreek, Ohio.

Rolling stock

References 

Buildings and structures in Waukesha County, Wisconsin
Heritage railroads in Wisconsin
Railway companies established in 1971
Railway companies disestablished in 2001
2001 disestablishments in Wisconsin
1971 establishments in Wisconsin